Ernst Friedrich Wilhelm Klinkerfues (29 March 1827 in Hofgeismar – 28 January 1884 in Göttingen) was a German astronomer and meteorologist. He discovered six comets and published weather reports of varying accuracy based on his meteorological measurements.

Early life

Klinkerfues was born in Hofgeismar, the son of army doctor Johann Reinhard Klinkerfues and his wife Sabine (née Dedolph). After the early death of his parents, he was brought up by relatives, and after attending high school qualified as a surveyor in Kassel. In this capacity he subsequently worked on the new Frankfurt - Kassel railway.

From 1847 to 1851 Klinkerfues studied mathematics and astronomy at the University of Marburg. He then became an assistant to Carl Friedrich Gauss at Göttingen Observatory, where he completed  his Ph.D. with a thesis on orbit calculations of double stars. After Gauss' death in 1855, the mathematician W. E. Weber replaced him as director, but Klinkerfues was to be temporarily responsible for the observatory from 1861.

Career 
Klinkerfues discovered 6 comets, and in 1860 led an expedition to Spain to observe a solar eclipse. He was finally appointed "director for practical astronomy" at Göttingen in 1868. However, the role of Klinkerfues' section of the observatory was solely to deal with practical work, the theoretical work being placed in the hands of Ernst Schering. Klinkerfues was, like his predecessor, allowed to live in the eastern wing of the observatory, but the division of the observatory's organisation between the two teams was to be a source of constant conflict.

In his 1871 book Theoretische Astronomie Klinkerfues described how the orbits of celestial bodies in the solar system could be calculated. In the same period he compiled a catalogue of around 6900 observed stars.

Klinkerfues also had an abiding interest in meteorology, developing a hygrometer, patented in 1877, that was later manufactured in Göttingen by Wilhelm Lambrecht. His weather forecasts, published in newspapers, proved to be often incorrect, which led to them cruelly parodying his last name as "Flunkerkies". Undeterred by this criticism, he published a book on the hygrometer's use in 1875, and developed a detonator for use in Göttingen's gas street lighting. He also continued to supervise doctoral students, one of whom was Hermann Kobold.

Klinkerfues was plagued by debt for much of his life, exacerbated by ill-advised business ventures. He attempted to persevere with his astronomical work, in the course of which, as his obituary in the Monthly Notices of the Royal Astronomical Society noted, he published many papers that were "singularly readable, and often contained the most original and suggestive ideas. Occasionally, indeed, they were altogether of a quaintly humorous character, introducing, for instance, the alleged wonderful discoveries of an imaginary Professor Monkhouse". Nevertheless, he continued to encounter problems with professional advancement: 
"It would be useless and almost impossible to attempt to describe how the warm-hearted and genial astronomer failed to take that position amongst his colleagues to which his undoubtedly great natural talents entitled him. His extreme carelessness in late years in his outward appearances was certainly much against him, but the unflagging zeal with which he delivered a whole course of lectures, if need were, even to a single student, ought to have told in his favour, as to some extent it doubtless did."

In 1881 he published Tobias Mayer's grössere Mondkarte nebst Detailzeichnungen, a large Moon map and set of drawings by Tobias Mayer that had gathered dust in the observatory library for 130 years.

Death 
The ongoing conflicts in the observatory, declining health, financial problems and further disappointments drove him to shoot himself on 28 January 1884. His university colleagues had to pay for his funeral.

Honors 
The asteroid 112328 Klinkerfues is named in his honour, as were 6 non-periodic comets.

Works

Theoretische Astronomie, 1871, 1899,
Theorie des Bifilar-Hygrometers, 1875
Prinzipien der Spektralanalyse, 1879

References

Sources

Siegmund Günther: Klinkerfues, Wilhelm. In: Allgemeine Deutsche Biographie (ADB). Bd. 51, Duncker & Humblot, Leipzig 1906, S. 231–233.
H. Michling: Im Schatten des Titanen – das tragische Leben des Astronomen Klinkerfues. Teile I bis IV. Göttinger Monatsblätter, März–Juni 1975

External links
 AN 108 (1884) 65/66 
 MNRAS 45 (1885) 203
 Obs 7 (1884) 117
 Portrait of Ernst Friedrich Wilhelm Klinkerfuss from the Lick Observatory Records Digital Archive, UC Santa Cruz Library's Digital Collections

1827 births
1884 deaths
People from Hofgeismar
19th-century German astronomers
Discoverers of comets